Other People's Children ( translit. Skhvisi shvilebi) is a 1958 Georgian black-and-white Social-themed drama film co-written with Rezo Japaridze and directed by Tengiz Abuladze.

Cast
Tsitsino Tsitsishvili	as Nato
Otar Koberidze as Dato
A. Qandaurashvili as Teo
Nani Chikvinidze as Lia
Mikho Borashvili as Gia
Sesilia Takaishvili as Elisabedi
Akaki Kvantaliani
Ekaterine Veruleishvili

Awards 
 International film festival in Porretta Terme, 1960 - Special award
 International film festival in Helsinki, 1959 — Diploma
 International film festival in London, 1959 — Diploma

References

External links
 

Georgian-language films
1958 films
1958 drama films
Soviet black-and-white films
Films directed by Tengiz Abuladze
Drama films from Georgia (country)
Black-and-white films from Georgia (country)
Soviet-era films from Georgia (country)